Andrei Alekseyevich Nemykin (born 20 February 1972) is a former Russian football player.

References

1972 births
Living people
Soviet footballers
Russian footballers
FC Kuban Krasnodar players
Russian Premier League players
FC Armavir players

Association football goalkeepers